Marek Slovák (born 23 September 1988) is a Slovak professional ice hockey player who currently plays with HC Košice of the Slovak Extraliga.

Career
Slovák previously played for HK Nitra, HC Nové Zámky, HKm Zvolen, HC Košice, MsHK Žilina and Bratislava Capitals. Slovák also played for the Yunost Minsk of the Belarusian Extraleague during the 2017–18 season.

Career statistics

Regular season and playoffs

International

References

External links

 

1988 births
Living people
Bratislava Capitals players
HK Nitra players
HC Nové Zámky players
HKM Zvolen players
HC Košice players
MsHK Žilina players
Yunost Minsk players
HC '05 Banská Bystrica players
Slovak ice hockey centres
Sportspeople from Nitra
Slovak expatriate sportspeople in Belarus
Expatriate ice hockey players in Belarus
Slovak expatriate ice hockey people